The Open Championship qualification was first introduced in 1907, and is the process that a player goes through to qualify for The Open Championship. The Open Championship is the oldest golf competition in the world, and generally regarded  as one of the most prestigious. The qualifying structure is designed to reduce more than 2,500 entrants on five continents, to a field size of 156 competing in the tournament.

In the modern era, the main way players qualify is by an exemption due to their performance in major golf tours, major tournaments, or their position in the official world golf rankings. For those who are not exempt, they can qualify by performing well in the Open Qualifying Series of international sanctioned tournaments, or via local qualifying in the UK.

The format of the final tournament was originally 36 holes played on a single day, but has evolved to the current format of four days of 18 holes, with the lowest scoring golfers cut after the first 36 holes.

Current qualifying process 
Players can qualify one of four ways, an exemption, via the Open Qualifying Series (OQS), via local qualifying, or if the field size has not reached 156, being one of the highest rated players in the official golf rankings that is not already qualified.

Exemption qualifiers 
Around 65% of the field is exempt from qualifying. Not all those eligible for entry will compete (e.g. older previous Open winners, and injured players).

The current criteria for an exemption is governed by the following rules:

Open Qualifying Series 

Around 22% of the field qualify via the Open Qualifying Series. It was introduced in 2014 and replaced international qualifying events run by the Open. Qualifying is available to the leading players (not otherwise exempt) who finish in the top n and ties, in around twelve events run by several international golf tours. The Open Series Qualifying events since 2019 are:

Note: 2021 tournament criteria affected by COVID-19

Local and Final qualifying 
Currently 12 players (8% of the field) qualify through final qualifying in the United Kingdom.

Local Qualifying 
Local qualifying begins with 13 events, of 36 holes occurring on a single day just over three weeks before the Open Championship. It is open to those who meet any of the following criteria:
 Male professional golfer.
 Male amateur golfer whose playing handicap does not exceed 0.4 (i.e. scratch).
 Male amateur golfer who has been within World Amateur Golf Ranking listing 1–2,000 during the current calendar year.
 Female golfer who finished in the top 5 and ties in the latest edition of any of the five women's majors.
A week later, the best performers then progress to final qualifying, where there are four events of 36 holes occurring on a single day, with three qualifiers from each event.

Final Qualifying 
In addition to the best performers at local qualifying, players who meet the following criteria are able to compete in final qualifying:
 Past champions of The Open.
 Any competitor with an Official World Golf Ranking in the top 1,000 and ties on the date of entry.
 Past champions of the Masters Tournament, the U.S. Open and the PGA Championship.
 Anyone who played in last held edition of the Open.
 First 10 and anyone tying for 10th place in the Titleist and FootJoy PGA Professional Championship.
 First 10 and anyone tying for 10th place in the PGA of America Professional Championship.
 Past playing members of Ryder and Presidents Cup Teams.
 Playing members of the 5 leading teams and ties in the Eisenhower Trophy.
 Playing members in the last St Andrews Trophy.
 The Amateur champions in the last 6 years.
 The U.S. Amateur champions in the last 6 years.
 The European Amateur champions in the last 6 years.
 The current English, Scottish, Irish and Welsh Amateur champions, from the respective closed Amateur Championships.
 The current runners-up in each of the Amateur Championship and European Amateur, and the U.S. Amateur.
 The leading 10 World Amateur Golf Ranking players, not otherwise exempt as at calendar week 21.
 The current Boys Amateur champion.
 The current Latin America Amateur champion and runner(s)-up.
 The current Asia-Pacific Amateur runners(s)-up. This is only applicable if the entrant has not played in the OQS Singapore.
Note: Any qualifier via an amateur performance must still have amateur status

Alternates 
If the field size has not reached 156, then the highest ranked players not already qualified are offered a spot in the Open.

Current format 

 Field: 156 players
 Basic format: 72 hole stroke play. Play 18 holes a day over four days, weather permitting.
 Date of tournament: Starts on the day before the third Friday in July.
 Tournament days: Thursday to Sunday.
 Tee off times: Each player has one morning and one afternoon tee time in first two days in groups of three, which are mostly randomised (with some organiser discretion). Groupings of two on the last two days with last place going off first and leaders going out last.
 Cut: After 36 holes, only top 70 and ties play the final 36 holes.
 Playoff: If there is a tie for the lead after 72 holes, a three-hole aggregate playoff is held; followed by sudden death if the lead is still tied.

History of qualification and format 

Qualifying was first introduced from 1907, except 1910–1911, where a 36 hole cut was made instead. 1926 was the first year where there was both a cut and qualifying, and this has been the situation ever since. Qualifying generally happened the day before or shortly before the Open, and everyone was required to qualify until 1962. In 1963 exemptions from qualification began, mainly for past champions, but this has now expanded to cover a multitude of achievements and most of the field now qualify by exemption. In the 1980s, the R&A was concerned that its process was not adequately allowing for players which played on multiple tours, and so actively brought about what is now known as the Official World Golf Ranking to use as part of the exemption process.

In 2004 international qualifying was introduced, which meant that players did not have to travel to the UK to participate in qualifying. This was replaced in 2014 by the Open Qualifying Series, which gave qualifying spots to the best performers in existing global golf events.

The biggest change to the format of the tournament was in 1892 when the tournament was expanded from 36 holes to 72 holes. Another notable change in the rules was making it mandatory to use the "bigger" ball (as was used in America) in 1974.

References